Mattox Bastion is one of the peaks of the Inland Forts in the Asgard Range, Victoria Land, Antarctica. Flory Cirque sits on its southwest slopes, on the north side of Taylor Glacier, between a pair of rock spurs named West Groin and East Groin. West Groin separates Flory Cirque from Mudrey Cirque. 

West Groin was the first of these features to be named; it was named by the British Antarctic Expedition of 1910–13, led by Captain Robert F. Scott. Mattox Bastion, Flory Cirque and East Groin were named later, by the Advisory Committee on Antarctic Names. Mattox Bastion was named for Commander Benjamin G. Mattox, U.S. Navy, officer-in-charge of the Naval Support Force winter-over detachment at McMurdo Station in 1971. East Groin was named in reference to West Groin, and Flory Cirque was named for Robert F. Flory, a United States Antarctic Research Program geologist at McMurdo Station for three seasons, 1968–71.

References 

Mountains of the Asgard Range
McMurdo Dry Valleys